The Museum of the Sea, opened in 1996, is a museum of natural history located in La Barra, in the department of Maldonado, Uruguay.

Overview
The museum contains over 5,000 specimens of marine fauna, all of which are clearly labelled. Among these specimens are whale skeletons, sea urchins, starfish and turtle shells. In addition, there are old photographs and an old bathing machine used by women in the early days of the 20th century, as well as telescopes and blunderbusses of the period. There is also an exhibit about the most famous pirates. This huge collection of objects, exhibits, photographs and stories is the work of the museum's creator, Pablo Etchegaray. This self-taught collector began his collection of marine-related items many years ago.

Exhibit halls
The Museum of the Sea is composed of four museums in one. In the Museum of the Sea, everything is related to marine life: whale skeletons, seashells, a deep sea room, interactive exhibits, an area where children can draw their own pictures, a section devoted to pirates and another to treasure. The Beach Resort Museum shows the history of holiday resorts, some of which are now city neighbourhoods, such as Pocitos and Carrasco, while others are tourist destinations, such as Punta del Este, La Paloma, Piriápolis, Atlántida, Mar del Plata and Copacabana. The Nostalgia Museum holds collections of vintage objects such as jars, tins, radio sets, medical remedies, photographs, and beach-related items such as beach umbrellas and pails that were used decades ago. Three collections and 38,000 specimens of insects are exhibited in the Insectarium. Most of the specimens are beetles, but there are also moths, cicadas, and grasshoppers, among other species.

References

External links
 Museum of the Sea website

1996 establishments in Uruguay
Museums established in 1996
Museums in Uruguay
Natural history museums
Maritime museums
Buildings and structures in Maldonado Department